The Chinese Elm cultivar Ulmus parvifolia 'Cork Bark' is a North American clone.

Description
Not available.

Pests and diseases
The species and its cultivars are highly resistant, but not immune, to Dutch elm disease, and unaffected by the Elm Leaf Beetle Xanthogaleruca luteola.

Synonymy
Ulmus parvifolia Jacq. corticosa

Accessions

North America
Dawes Arboretum , Newark, Ohio; US. 2 trees, as 'Corkbark'. No acc. details available.
Niagara Parks Botanical Gardens, Canada. Acc. no. 990142

References

Chinese elm cultivar
Ulmus articles missing images
Ulmus